Gabriel, in comics, may refer to:

 Gabriel the Devil Hunter, a Marvel Comics character
 Gabriel the Air-Walker, another Marvel character

See also
 Gabriel (given name)